Gisèle Ory (born 30 April 1956 in Biel/Bienne) is a politician from the Canton of Neuchâtel in Switzerland. She is a member of the Socialist Party.

Gisèle Ory graduated from the University of Lausanne (political sciences) in 1978. In 1996, she was elected to the Communal Council of Neuchâtel, the local Parliament. In 2001 she was elected to the National Council. From 2001 to 2002 she was Chairwoman of the Neuchâtel section of the SP, but had to leave because of her nomination as spokeswoman of the Federal Department of the Interior.

Gisèle Ory was elected to the Council of States in 2003 along with Socialist Jean Studer. After Studer's resignation in 2006, she was joined by Pierre Bonhôte (Social Democratic Party of Switzerland), who won a by-election against Philippe Bauer (Liberal Party of Switzerland).

External links

1956 births
Living people
People from Biel/Bienne
University of Lausanne alumni
Members of the National Council (Switzerland)
Members of the Council of States (Switzerland)
Women members of the National Council (Switzerland)
Women members of the Council of States (Switzerland)
20th-century Swiss women politicians
20th-century Swiss politicians
21st-century Swiss women politicians
21st-century Swiss politicians